Shansitherium ("beast of Shanxi") is an extinct genus of superficially moose-like or antelope-like giraffids from the late Miocene epoch of Shanxi Province, China. They are closely related to the genus Samotherium.

Species

The genus consists of the following species:

 Shansitherium fuguensis
 Shansitherium tafeli
 Shansitherium quadricornis

References

External links
 

Prehistoric giraffes
Miocene mammals of Asia
Miocene even-toed ungulates
Miocene genus extinctions
Prehistoric even-toed ungulate genera